Labaran Abdul Madari, more commonly known as Abdul Madari, is a lawmaker from Kano State and a Nigerian politician. He was elected the Majority Leader for the second time in the Kano State House of Assembly on December 15, 2020.

Early life and education 
Abdul Madari was born in 1968 at Madarin Mata of the Warawa Local Government Area of Kano State. He attended Kawo Cikin Gari Primary School in Warawa, and Government Secondary School in Garko. Madari also attended Minjibir Teacher's College for his Grade II Certificate and he obtained his diploma from the Federal College of Education, Kano.

Politics 
Madari was elected as a Member of Kano State House of Assembly in 2007 Nigerian general election and retained the seat for over three consecutive elections in 2011, 2015, and 2019. and is currently serving his fourth term. He is in the circle of principal officers of the Kano State House of Assembly, where he served as the Chief Whip from 2015 to 2019, and became the Majority leader in 2019  before he was impeached in 2020. Madari and 4 others were unlawfully suspended by the Speaker of the house, and the court declared their suspension a violation of Section 109 of the 1999 Nigerian Constitution.

On the 14th of December, 2020, Right Honourable Abdulaziz Garba Gafasa resigned as the speaker of Kano State House of Assembly, and Hamisu Chidari was elected the Speaker of the House together with Madari as Majority Leader on the 15th of December, 2020.

References 

1968 births
Candidates in the 2015 Nigerian general election
Bayero University Kano alumni
Politicians from Kano
People from Kano State
21st-century Nigerian politicians
Living people